Abby Berlin (August 7, 1907 — August 16, 1965) was best known as a director of feature films and television productions. He began on Broadway and Vaudeville as part of a comedy team with Ken Brown in the 1920s. By 1939, he had moved to Hollywood, where he worked as an assistant director, before getting his opportunity to helm his own films with 1945's Leave It to Blondie. He was married at least twice, his first wife, Jean, committed suicide after arguing with him; his second wife was B-movie actress Iris Meredith.

Life and career
Berlin was born in New York City on August 7, 1907. By the late 1920s, he had teamed up Ken Brown as a comedy song/dance duo, who performed on both Broadway and on the Vaudeville circuit. The team had garnered the nickname the "Two Knights of Knonsense".

In the 1930s, he moved to Hollywood, and was working as an assistant director on films by the end of the decade, many of them in the Blondie franchise. His first film as 1939's Blondie Takes a Vacation. Over the next six years, he would assist on nineteen movies. Outside of the Blondie films, he would work on such notable productions as Go West, Young Lady (1941), City Without Men (1943), Sahara (1943), What a Woman! (1943), The Boy from Stalingrad (1943), The Impatient Years (1944), and 1945's A Song to Remember. In 1945, he was given the opportunity to helm his own picture, Leave It to Blondie. It was the first film after Columbia re-booted the series. He directed a total of twelve feature films, nine of which were in the Blondie franchise. His other features included the romantic comedy, Father Is a Bachelor (1950 - which he co-directed with Norman Foster), which stars William Holden and Coleen Gray; and the 1950 crime drama, Double Deal.

With the advent of television, Berlin moved to the small screen, where he directed on numerous series, including Blondie, Lassie, and The Ann Sothern Show. His direction of William Bendix in transforming the radio program to the small screen, was credited with making The Life of Riley a success. In 1965, he would return to the big screen one last time, as an assistant director on The Great Sioux Massacre. On August 19, 1965, Berlin died shortly after working on The Great Sioux Massacre, before it opened in September.

Berlin was married at least twice. During the 1930s, he married actress Jean Berlin. Just as he was beginning his directing career, in November 1939, the couple had an argument. Afterwards, Jean committed suicide by poisoning herself. Later, in 1943, he married Iris Meredith, when the two eloped to Yuma, Arizona while he was working on Sahara. The two remained married to until his death in 1965.

Filmography

(Per AFI database)

Blondie Brings Up Baby  (1939) - Assistant director
Blondie Takes a Vacation  (1939) - Assistant director
The Stranger from Texas  (1939) - Assistant director
So You Won't Talk  (1940) - Assistant director
Blondie Has Servant Trouble  (1940) - Assistant director
Blondie Plays Cupid  (1940) - Assistant director
Blondie Goes Latin  (1941) - Assistant director
Blondie in Society  (1941) - Assistant director
Go West, Young Lady  (1941) - Assistant director
Her First Beau  (1941) - Assistant director
Two Latins from Manhattan  (1941) - Assistant director
Blondie for Victory  (1942) - Assistant director
Blondie Goes to College  (1942) - Assistant director
Blondie's Blessed Event  (1942) - Assistant director
Meet the Stewarts  (1942) - Assistant director
City Without Men  (1943) - Assistant director
Dangerous Blondes  (1943) - Assistant director
Sahara  (1943) - Assistant director
What a Woman!  (1943) - Assistant director
The Boy from Stalingrad  (1943) - Assistant director
The Impatient Years  (1944) - Assistant director
Ever Since Venus  (1944) - Assistant director
Leave It to Blondie  (1945) - Director
A Song to Remember  (1945) - Assistant director
Life with Blondie  (1945) - Director
Blondie Knows Best  (1946) - Director
Blondie's Lucky Day  (1946) - Director
Blondie in the Dough  (1947) - Director
Blondie's Anniversary  (1947) - Director
Blondie's Big Moment  (1947) - Director
Blondie's Holiday  (1947) - Director
Blondie's Reward  (1948) - Director
Mary Ryan, Detective  (1950) - Director
Double Deal  (1950) - Director
Father Is a Bachelor  (1950) - Director
The Great Sioux Massacre  (1965) - Assistant director

References

External links
 

1907 births
1965 deaths
Film directors from New York City